Latrez Harrison (born July 30, 1980, in Atlanta, Georgia) is a former Arena Football League wide receiver/defensive back for the New York Dragons.  He attended the University of Maryland.  Harrison played quarterback at Maryland as a true freshman in 1999 and again in 2001 as a redshirt sophomore.  He was converted into a wide receiver for his junior and senior seasons.

He attended Booker T. Washington High School in Atlanta, Georgia where he was named an honorable mention All-American by USA Today.

References
 Latrez Harrison University of Maryland Biography
 AFL stats from arenafan.com

1980 births
Living people
Players of American football from Atlanta
American football wide receivers
American football defensive backs
Maryland Terrapins football players
New York Dragons players